Berhthun or Beorhthun is an Anglo-Saxon name that can refer to:

 Berthun of Sussex - a 7th-century Sussex nobleman
 Berhthun (bishop) - an 8th-century Bishop of Lichfield
 Berchtun of Beverley - an 8th-century Northumbrian saint